Andrew Philip "Drew" Shirley (born April 3, 1974) is an American rock guitarist, formerly of All Together Separate, and of the Grammy Award winning alternative rock band Switchfoot from 2005 until 2022.

Career
Shirley attended California Baptist University studying a Fine Arts degree with a Music minor. During that time, he also started and led various school bands and shows. He had only started playing guitar as a senior in high school. After graduating from college, he also began working with YFC as the Riverside area Campus Life director, working with local high schools.

Shirley played in the band All Together Separate in the late 1990s along with fellow CBU classmates Dex Alexander (singer), Ben Rayls (drummer), and Charles Rumahlewang (bass). The band toured nationally, but was cut short after breaking up in 2002.

He started touring with Switchfoot soon after their 2003 release The Beautiful Letdown. He became an official member of the band on May 4, 2005. He has recorded eight LP albums with the band: Nothing Is Sound (2005), Oh! Gravity. (2006), Grammy-winning Hello Hurricane (2009), Vice Verses (2011), Fading West (2013), Where the Light Shines Through (2016), "Native Tongue" (2019), and "Interrobang" (2021).

Between leaving All Together Separate and his transition to Switchfoot, Shirley produced and played guitar on many different band projects.  He still produces and plays on various musical projects.

On February 21, 2022, it was announced that Shirley had departed the band. In an e-mail, the band stated "Friends, there's no easy way to say this. After years of sharing the road, Drew and the band have decided to take different paths, and will be parting ways. He joined us shortly after the release of our 4th album and we’ve shared an incredible journey, full of countless highs and lows together. We love Drew dearly, and we are so thankful for the time and memories we have had. This has certainly been a difficult season for us, encountering challenges that have ultimately taken us in different directions. We have always said that our friendships are more important than the band. And it's still true: our love for each other is so much bigger than rock and roll. We are excited to see what the next chapter holds for Drew, and also for Switchfoot. We are beyond thankful for the support that all of you have shown us during this challenging time and we remain committed to this community, each other, and to the journey we share together. More now than ever before, hope deserves an anthem."

Personal life
Drew grew up in the Rancho Peñasquitos, community in San Diego, California. There, he attended Black Mountain Middle School and graduated from Mt. Carmel High School. Shirley's father was a Navy Chaplain, and his mother, Nancy, is a youth choir teacher who has previously worked with local middle and high schools as well as community organizations including the San Diego Children's Choir and area churches. He has a younger brother.

Shirley married his wife, Jenna, in 2001. The couple has four daughters: Lauren (born 2004), Violet (born 2008), Isa, and Haven.

Discography

All Together Separate
 All Together Separate (1999)
 Ardent Worship Live (2001)
 Unusual (2002)

Switchfoot
 Nothing Is Sound (2005)
 Oh! Gravity. (2006)                                                   
 Hello Hurricane (2009)
 Vice Verses (2011)
 Fading West (2014)
 The Edge of the Earth (2014)
 Where the Light Shines Through (2016)
 Native Tongue (2019)
  Interrobang (2021)

References

1974 births
Living people
American rock guitarists
American male guitarists
Switchfoot members
California Baptist University alumni
Grammy Award winners